Arcobacter suis is a species of bacteria first isolated from pork meat. Its type strain is F41T (=CECT 7833T = LMG 26152T).

References

Further reading
Giacometti, Federica, et al. "Characterization of Arcobacter suis isolated from water buffalo (Bubalus bubalis) milk." Food Microbiology 51 (2015): 186–191.
Levican, Arturo, et al. "Arcobacter ebronensis sp. nov. and Arcobacter aquimarinus sp. nov., two new species isolated from marine environment."Systematic and Applied Microbiology 38.1 (2015): 30-35.
Levican, Arturo, and María J. Figueras. "Performance of five molecular methods for monitoring Arcobacter spp." BMC Microbiology 13.1 (2013): 220.
Fisher, Jenny C., et al. "Population dynamics and ecology of Arcobacter in sewage." Frontiers in microbiology 5 (2014).

External links
LPSN

Campylobacterota
Bacteria described in 2013